Giles Brook or Brooke (c. 1553–1614), was an English politician who sat in the House of Commons from 1604 to 1611.

Brook was  member of a family that served Liverpool for many years. He was an alderman of Liverpool and was bailiff in 1584. He was Lord Mayor of Liverpool in 1592. In 1604, he was elected Member of Parliament for Liverpool and sat until 1611.

References

1550s births
1614 deaths
Mayors of Liverpool
Place of birth missing
16th-century births
17th-century deaths
16th-century English people
Members of the Parliament of England (pre-1707) for Liverpool
English MPs 1604–1611